The Austral Salon of Music, Literature and the Fine Arts  also known as the Austral Salon is a club that was established for women interested in the fine arts in Melbourne.

Establishment
The Austral Salon was founded in January 1890 by female journalists led by Mary Hirst Browne, as a meeting place for women writers. The Countess of Hopetoun, wife of the Victorian Governor, later first Governor-General of Australia, was the Salon’s first Patron. Journalist Agnes Murphy, poet Ada Cambridge and journalist Catherine Hay Thomson were among the founders of the Austral Salon.

The club was originally located at 115-119 Collins Street, Melbourne in the Austral Building.

Activities
Before the opening of the Melbourne Conservatorium of Music the Austral club helped aspiring musicians. Artists such as Ada Crossley, Amy Castles, Florence Austral, Marjorie Lawrence and Nellie Melba performed at the Austral Salon.

The Salon was one of the first four groups to affiliate with the National Council of Women of Victoria in 1902.

The Salon continues as The Austral Salon of Music, a Melbourne society committed to encouraging young musicians that holds regular recitals at St Peters Church, East Melbourne.

See also
 Austral Building

References

External links
 Austral Salon

Women's clubs in Australia
1890 establishments in Australia